The 2010 Kyrgyzstan League was the 19th season since the establishment of the Kyrgyzstan League. The season began on March 27 and ended in November 2010.

Clubs

The following nine clubs were to play in Kyrgyzstan League during the 2010 season. Only 5 clubs played in the previous season. 

Abdysh-Ata (Kant)
FC Ak-Zhol (Aravan) 1
FC Alay (Osh) 2
Alga (Bishkek)
Dordoi-Dynamo (Naryn)
FC Khimik Kara-Balta (Kara-Balta)
FC Neftchi Kochkor-Ata (Kochkor-Ata)
Sher-Ak-Dan (Bishkek)
Zhashtyk Ak Altyn Kara-Suu (Kara-Suu) 1

1 Withdrew after political developments in April.
2 Apparently withdrew as well.

Format
Nine clubs played a two-round-robin system to decide the top four teams who will again play home-and-away to decide the winner. There was an intention to play a third round-robin, but this was cancelled.

League table

References

External links
 Kyrgyzstan - League - Results, fixtures, tables and news - Soccerway

Kyrgyzstan League seasons
1
Kyrgyzstan
Kyrgyzstan